Captain Frederick William Leopold Thomas, c.1812–1885, RN, FSA (Scot) was a naval officer, photographer, and historian, noted for his surveys of Scotland, and for taking the first photographs of St Kilda.

Life
Thomas was born about 1812, his father George Thomas being a Master in the Royal Navy. He joined his father's surveying ship,  in January 1827. He passed his examination in 1835. He served as mate and assistant surveyor in Investigator, and then in HMS Mastiff, also under his father's command. He was promoted to Lieutenant in 1841, taking command of the Woodlark. He was promoted to Commander in 1860, and retired with the rank of Captain in 1864. He married Frances Sarah Bousfield on 2 December 1841. They had one child, a son, who died in 1850. Thomas died in Edinburgh in 1885.

Surveying on sea and land

His work as a hydrographic surveyor was mainly in Scotland. The earliest work, when he was assisting his father, was in Orkney, and he continued this after his father's death. He was then employed in the Firth of Forth and later in the Western Isles. His surveying work resulted in at least 15 charts and several contributions to Sailing Directions. As well as hydrographic surveying, Thomas carried out important work on the archaeology of the northern and western isles. This involved relatively little excavation, but much surveying and recording. He authored several papers on this work, from 1851, including a plan of the barrows, standing stones and other structures around Stenness, Orkney (Thomas, 1851) which was the first detailed survey of this area; and descriptions of buildings such as black houses, beehive houses and brochs in the Outer Hebrides (Thomas, 1862, 1890).

Plan of the antiquities of Stenness, Orkney, from Thomas (1851)

Naturalist

Thomas was also important as a naturalist, mainly collecting zoophytes (coelenterates and bryozoa) and molluscs. His specimens are frequently referred to in the major works on zoophytes by Johnston (1847)  
and on molluscs by Forbes and Hanley (1853) and Jeffreys (1869). Rendall (1956) regarded Thomas as particularly important among the early conchologists, particularly for his work in Orkney. He provided details of the location and depth in which specimens were found, and many of his specimens were of rarer species, indicating that he was familiar with the commoner ones.

People of the Islands

Thomas was interested in the people of the islands as well as in the archaeological remains. He noted that some of the beehive houses in Lewis and Harris were still in use as dwellings for the summer pastures, whereas elsewhere in Scotland and Ireland such buildings had been abandoned or were only used for storage. He described the living arrangements in these houses, as well as recounting legends associated with them, such as that of the shape-shifting Each-uisge or water horse (Thomas, 1862). In 1863, in the company of fellow antiquarian Arthur Mitchell on Lewis, he met a stone-breaker eating out of a traditional unglazed earthenware pot, and they investigated the making and use of these vessels, known as craggans. He also collected at least one ballad (Thomas, 1855) and recounted traditional stories of clan warfare and revenge (Thomas, 1878,1880). In 1857 his wife Frances travelled with him to Harris, where they set up home for a while. She was much struck with the poverty of the islanders, exacerbated by their isolation. Frances saw there could be a demand for woollen goods on the mainland, and first promoted knitted stockings, and then together with Lady Dunmore, developed a market for Harris Tweed. There he took the earliest photographs ever taken of St Kilda. While on St Kilda, Thomas made the acquaintance of the Rev. Mr. Kennedy, and asked him for information on antiquarian matters. The reply came from his niece, Anne Kennedy, and provides many details.

Affiliations
Thomas was a member of the Photographic Society of Scotland and the Society of Antiquaries of Scotland.

Modern media
In 2004, a television documentary employing Thomas's 1860 photography was broadcast on Grampian Television.

References

Bibliography

External links

Coasts of Scotland on marine charts, 1580s-1900s at the National Library of Scotland.

19th-century Scottish historians
19th-century Scottish photographers
People associated with Edinburgh
Royal Navy officers
1885 deaths
1812 births
Scottish hydrographers
Fellows of the Society of Antiquaries of Scotland